Jiang Boju (born September 1937 –) is a Chinese mathematician and a professor of Peking University, School of Mathematical Sciences. He is known for his contributions to topology.

Honors 
He was elected to be a member of the Chinese Academy of Sciences in 1980 and a fellow of TWAS in 1985.

Family 
Jiang Boju's father Jiang Lifu was a mathematician and educator widely regarded as the Father of modern Chinese mathematics.

References 

1937 births
Members of the Chinese Academy of Sciences
Living people